The Ven. Assheton Pownall    (31 October 1822 – 24 November 1886) was Archdeacon of Leicester from 1884 until his death.
 
Born in Walton, Liverpool, Pownall was educated at Brasenose College, Oxford. He was Rector of South Kilworth for 39 years. He died in Dover in 1886.

His grandson was the military officer and politician Sir Assheton Pownall.

References

Alumni of Brasenose College, Oxford
Archdeacons of Leicester
1822 births
1886 deaths
People from Walton, Liverpool
Fellows of the Society of Antiquaries of London
Clergy from Liverpool